Esbeydi Viridiana Salazar Suaste (born 2 January 1998), known as Viridiana Salazar, is a Mexican professional football player who plays as a forward for Liga MX Femenil club CF Pachuca and the Mexico women's national team.

References

External links
 
 

1998 births
Living people
Women's association football forwards
Mexican women's footballers
Footballers from Quintana Roo
Mexico women's international footballers
Liga MX Femenil players
C.F. Pachuca (women) footballers
Mexican footballers